Ishta may refer to:
 Ishta (film), a 2011 Kannada-language film
 Ishta (Stargate), a character in Stargate SG-1
Iṣṭa-devatā (Hinduism), a term denoting a worshipper's favourite deity
Emma Ishta (born 1990), Australian model and actress